Degree of Murder is a 1967 West German film, starring Anita Pallenberg and directed by Volker Schlöndorff.  The film is mainly known because of the soundtrack composed by Brian Jones (founder and multi-instrumentalist of the Rolling Stones), Pallenberg's boyfriend at the time.

The film won three German Film Awards. It was entered into the 1967 Cannes Film Festival.

It was filmed in colour in West Germany in 1967.

Plot
Marie (Anita Pallenberg) shoots her ex-boyfriend with his own gun, after he attempts to beat her.  Instead of reporting this to the police she hires two men to help her dump the body in a construction site near an autobahn.  While doing this she becomes romantically involved with both men.

Cast
 Anita Pallenberg as Marie
 Hans Peter Hallwachs as Gunther
 Manfred Fischbeck as Fritz
 Werner Enke as Hans
 Kurt Bulau as (uncredited)
 Willy Harlander (uncredited)
 Angela Hillebrecht  (uncredited)
 Sonja Karzau  (uncredited)

Home Media
The film was released on Blu-ray and DVD in Germany in 2019.

Soundtrack

The soundtrack by Brian Jones has never had an official release, possibly because of legal conflicts. Jones played on the soundtrack, while Yardbirds guitarist Jimmy Page, session pianist Nicky Hopkins, musician Peter Gosling, and Small Faces drummer Kenny Jones also contributed their respective instruments to the recording sessions which took place between late 1966 and early 1967 at IBC Studios in London. Jones stated that "ranging from one musician to ten. I ran the gamut of line-ups - from the conventional brass combination to a country-band with Jew's harp, violin and banjo. In the main the musicians were established session men - though some of the boys from the group also played." but Rolling Stones bassist Bill Wyman has said that neither he nor drummer Charlie Watts participated and Jones never specified exactly which members played on the soundtrack. Neither Jagger nor Richards have stated their involvement in the soundtrack. Jones also claimed that included many session musicians, but according to the session logs most of the instrumentation was done by Jones himself.

In Rolling Stone issue #1171, Jimmy Page talks about working on the soundtrack. "Brian knew what he was doing. It was quite beautiful. Some of it was made up at the time; some of it was stuff I was augmenting with him. I was definitely playing with the violin bow. Brian had this guitar that had a volume pedal – he could get gunshots with it. There was a Mellotron there. He was moving forward with ideas."

Audio engineer, Glyn Johns said that he and Jones didn't get along personally but worked well on the project, Johns said "Brian came to me and asked for help. He'd lost so much self-confidence by this time and really was in need of a hand. In a way I felt sorry for him. It wasn't that I didn't think he was capable of handling the project himself. But clearly he wanted help in the engineering. So I agreed. Brian worked very hard in his Courtfield flat on two little tape machines. He had all types of ideas which worked. He did it very well, and it came out amazingly. And we had a good time doing it. Brian was extremely together and confident while he was working on it. When it was finished he was both pleased and relieved. The rock 'n' roll bit which was written to fit the early murder scene was really good."

The musicians were:
 Brian Jones: sitar, organ, mellotron, recorder, banjo, harpsichord, autoharp, dulcimer, clarinet, harmonica
 Jimmy Page: guitars
 Nicky Hopkins: piano
 Kenny Jones: drums
 Glyn Johns: engineering
 Peter Gosling: backing vocals (on one song)
 Mike Leander: orchestra

References

External links
 
 A Degree of Murder 1967

1967 films
1967 crime drama films
Films directed by Volker Schlöndorff
Films produced by Rob Houwer
Films set in Munich
German crime drama films
1960s German-language films
Constantin Film films
Universal Pictures films
West German films
1960s German films